Linda Savļaka (born 1 January 1984) is a Latvian biathlete. She competed in three events at the 2006 Winter Olympics.

References

1984 births
Living people
Biathletes at the 2006 Winter Olympics
Latvian female biathletes
Olympic biathletes of Latvia
Place of birth missing (living people)
People from Gulbene